Ceryx elasson is a moth of the subfamily Arctiinae. It was described by William Jacob Holland in 1893. It is found in Cameroon, the Republic of the Congo and Gabon.

References

Ceryx (moth)
Moths described in 1893
Insects of Cameroon
Fauna of the Republic of the Congo
Fauna of Gabon
Moths of Africa